Kelsall is a civil parish in Cheshire West and Chester, England. It contains six buildings that are recorded in the National Heritage List for England as designated listed buildings, all of which are at Grade II. This grade is the lowest of the three gradings given to listed buildings and is applied to "buildings of national importance and special interest". Much of the parish is occupied by the village of Kelsall, with the rest of the parish rural. The listed buildings consist of farmhouses, farm buildings, a church and a lock-up.

See also
 Listed buildings in Ashton Hayes
 Listed buildings in Delamere
 Listed buildings in Horton-cum-Peel
 Listed buildings in Oakmere
 Listed buildings in Tarvin
 Listed buildings in Willington

References
Citations

Sources

Listed buildings in Cheshire West and Chester
Lists of listed buildings in Cheshire